This is a discography of works by British singer-songwriter Robin Gibb as a solo artist. For information about recordings made by the Bee Gees see Bee Gees discography. Gibb's entire song catalogue is published by Universal Music Publishing Group.

Albums

Studio albums

Live albums

Extended plays

Singles

Other credits
The Titanic Requiem - Credited as "Composed by Robin Gibb and RJ Gibb" by Royal Philharmonic Orchestra

References

External links
 Robin Gibb discography at Discogs

Discography
Discographies of British artists
Rock music discographies